Sgt. Pepper's Lonely Hearts Club Band is a double album produced by George Martin, featuring covers of songs by the Beatles. It was released in July 1978, as the soundtrack to the film Sgt. Pepper's Lonely Hearts Club Band, which starred the Bee Gees, Peter Frampton and Steve Martin.

Overview
The project was managed by the Robert Stigwood Organisation (RSO). In 1975, the original plans for the album were suspended due to a dispute between Columbia and RSO. RSO invested $12 million into this soundtrack and the profit offset set against costs such as $1 million for promotion. The creation of the soundtrack was marked with tension from the beginning, with Frampton and the Bee Gees both feeling wary of the other artist as well as being unsure as to how their music would work together on the same album.

The release made history as being the first record to "return platinum", with over four million copies of it taken off store shelves and shipped back to distributors. Hundreds of thousands of copies of the album ended up being destroyed by RSO. The company itself experienced a considerable financial loss and the Bee Gees as a group had their musical reputation tarnished, though other involved bands such as Aerosmith were unscathed in terms of their popularity.

The album has been released on compact disc, and along with the soundtrack of Stayin' Alive, one of the only two Bee Gees-related titles for which the master tapes remained with Universal Music when the band gained control of its catalogue.

Critical reception 

In a contemporary review for The Village Voice, music critic Robert Christgau gave the album a D+ rating with an added "Must to Avoid" warning. He wrote that, apart from the Earth, Wind & Fire and Aerosmith songs, "most of the arrangements are lifted whole without benefit of vocal presence (maybe Maurice should try hormones) or rhythmic integrity ('Can't we get a little of that disco feel in there, George?')" Writing in The Rolling Stone Record Guide in 1983, Dave Marsh dismissed the soundtrack as an "utter travesty" and "[e]asily the worst album of any notoriety in this book." Marsh identified Aerosmith's "Come Together" and Earth, Wind & Fire's "Got to Get You into My Life" as the only competent renditions and concluded: "Two million people bought this album, which proves that P.T. Barnum was right and that euthanasia may have untapped possibilities."

According to Stephen Thomas Erlewine of AllMusic, the album suffers from clumsy performances by the Bee Gees, Frankie Howerd and Peter Frampton, as well as performers who were poorly suited to their song, including Steve Martin, George Burns and Alice Cooper. Erlewine says that the soundtrack has become "a legend in its own right" due to its unenviable reputation and adds that, while it has attracted a cult following, "there's no erasing the fact that this is an absolutely atrocious record".

Commercial performance and fallout
Sgt. Pepper's Lonely Hearts Club Band debuted at number 7 on the U.S. Billboard album chart and stayed at number 5 for six weeks. Although there was reported resistance to the interpretation of the Beatles' songs, such as Martin's comedic take on "Maxwell's Silver Hammer", Earth, Wind & Fire's version of "Got To Get You Into My Life" became a million selling single, while Robin Gibb's "Oh! Darling" and Aerosmith's version of "Come Together" both charted in the top 40.

Radio airplay trailed off when the film was released with poor reviews, only five weeks later. The album immediately dropped out of the top 100 and pre-sale shipments to the USA failed to sell in the quantities predicted. Owing to low box office receipts the film failed to make back its production costs, but profits from the soundtrack album and the successful singles it spawned later covered those losses.

The Bee Gees blamed their declining popularity in part on their involvement with the whole project, coupled with their mutual struggles with drug addiction. The latter was exacerbated by the environment of making the film and its soundtrack, with Maurice Gibb expressing shock at seeing crew members carrying around bags full of cocaine. Robin Gibb in particular spent much of this period having to dose himself with barbiturates to even be able to sleep. Some of the most vicious criticism of the soundtrack was leveled at them, and the musicians felt a particularly painful sting at being labeled as mere "Beatles imitators" since that sort of pejorative tag had been with them since they began their pop rock work in the 1960s. (Although the Bee Gees would continue to be popular into 1979, that year's backlash against disco, a genre in which the band had made their biggest impact, marred their careers permanently.)

George Martin had agreed to become involved in the project due partly to the amount of money offered for his services, and to his wife's suggestion that any other producer might afford the songs less respect than they were due. The selections by Earth Wind & Fire and Aerosmith were the only tracks he did not work on. According to author Robert Rodriguez, Martin later rued his involvement in Sgt. Pepper.

Track listing

Personnel

George Martin — Arranger, Producer 
Greg Adams — Trumpet
Robert Ahwai — Guitar 
Wilbur Bascomb Jr — Bass 
Jeff Beck — Guitar
Larry Carlton — Guitar 
Alice Cooper — Vocals 
Ray Cooper — Percussion 
Earth, Wind & Fire — Performers
Sandy Farina — Vocals 
Victor Feldman — Percussion
Peter Frampton — Vocals, Guitar
The Bee Gees — Performers
David Hungate — Bass 
Stephen "Doc" Kupka — Baritone saxophone 
Max Middleton — Synthesizer, Keyboards 
Francis Monkman — Moog Synthesizer 
Paul Nicholas — Vocals 
David Paich — Keyboards
Jeff Porcaro — Drums 
Billy Preston — Vocals, Hammond Organ 
Bernard "Pretty" Purdie — Drums, Percussion 
Tommy Reilly — Harmonica 
Ray Russell — Guitar

Singles
"Come Together" — Aerosmith — Reached #23 on the Billboard Hot 100. 
"Get Back" — Billy Preston — Reached #86 on the Billboard Hot 100.
"Got To Get You Into My Life" — Earth, Wind & Fire — (Also released on Earth, Wind & Fire Greatest Hits Vol 1). Reached #9 on the Billboard Hot 100 and #1 on U.S. R&B charts.
"Oh! Darling" — Robin Gibb — Reached #15 on the Billboard Hot 100.

Charts

Weekly charts

Year-end charts

Certifications

See also
Sgt. Pepper's Lonely Hearts Club Band (film)
The Robert Stigwood Organisation
Bee Gees discography
List of music considered the worst

Notes

References
Ashyia, Gale and Henderson, N. Contemporary Black Biography. Gale / Cengage Learning (2001). Digitized 17 Sep 2008. 
Denisoff, Serge R. and Romanowski, William D. Risky Business: rock in film. Transaction Publishers (1991). 
Martin, George and Hornsby, Jeremy. All you need is ears. Reprint. St. Martin's Press (1994). 
Muir, Kenneth John. The rock & roll film encyclopedia. Applause Theatre & Cinema Books (2007). .

External links

1978 soundtrack albums
Glam rock albums
Polydor Records soundtracks
A&M Records soundtracks
RSO Records soundtracks
The Beatles tribute albums
Albums produced by George Martin
Comedy film soundtracks
Musical film soundtracks